Pitcairnia armata is a species of flowering plant in the family Bromeliaceae, endemic to Venezuela. It was first described in 1889.

References

armata
Flora of Venezuela
Plants described in 1889